The 1994–95 Segunda Divisão de Honra season was the fifth season of the competition and the 61st season of recognised second-tier football in Portugal.

Overview
The league was contested by 18 teams with Leça FC winning the championship and gaining promotion to the Primeira Liga along with SC Campomaiorense and FC Felgueiras. At the other end of the table Portimonense SC, Amora FC and SCU Torreense were relegated to the Segunda Divisão.

League standings

Footnotes

External links
 Portugal 1994/95 - RSSSF (Paulo Claro)
 Portuguese II Liga 1994/1995 - footballzz.co.uk

Portuguese Second Division seasons
Port
2